The University of Goma is a public university in the Democratic Republic of the Congo. The university was created in 1993 and it is located in the city of Goma, near Lake Kivu in the east of the country.  The rector of the school is Jean-Baptiste Gakura Semacumu.

External links
 University of Goma's page at the Agence universitaire de la Francophonie 
Southern African University

Goma
Goma
Educational institutions established in 1993
1993 establishments in Zaire